Maureen Louys (born 3 November 1978 in Liège) is a Belgian television presenter.

Career
In 2005 she co-presented the 2005 Junior Eurovision Song Contest with Marcel Vanthilt. Louys still remained associated with the regular Eurovision Song Contest as giving out the Belgian televotes during the voting in 2007, 2009 and 2011. Following the death of Jean-Pierre Hautier in October 2012, Louys is currently the RTBF Eurovision Commentator, together with colleague Jean-Louis Lahaye.

In 2009 Louys presented RTBF's Best of humor.

In 2012, she's the host of The Voice Belgique on La Une.

References

External links

Living people
1978 births
People from Liège
Belgian television presenters
Belgian radio presenters
Belgian women radio presenters
Belgian women television presenters